Iron-sulfur cluster assembly enzyme ISCU, mitochondrial is a protein that in humans is encoded by the ISCU gene. It encodes an iron-sulfur (Fe-S) cluster scaffold protein involved in [2Fe-2S] and [4Fe-4S] cluster synthesis and maturation. A deficiency of ISCU is associated with a mitochondrial myopathy with lifelong exercise intolerance where only minor exertion causes tachycardia, shortness of breath, muscle weakness and myalgia.

Structure 
ISCU is located on the q arm of chromosome 12 in position 23.3 and has 8 exons. ISCU, the protein encoded by this gene, is a member of the NifU family. It is an iron-sulfur transferase that contains binding sites for [2Fe-2S] and [4Fe-4S] clusters. ISCU contains a transit peptide, 4 beta strands, 4 alpha helixes, and 4 turns. Alternative splicing results in transcript variants encoding different protein isoforms that localize either to the cytosol or to the mitochondrion. A pseudogene of this gene is present on chromosome 1.

Function 
ISCU encodes a component of the iron-sulfur (Fe-S) cluster scaffold responsible for the synthesis and maturation of [2Fe-2S] and [4Fe-4S] clusters. Fe-S clusters are cofactors that play a role in the function of a diverse set of enzymes, including those that regulate metabolism, iron homeostasis, and oxidative stress response. In one process, the [2Fe-2S] cluster transiently assembles on ISCU and is then transferred to GLRX5 in a cysteine desulfurase complex NFS1-LYRM4/ISD11 dependent process.

ISCU has two isoforms, isoform 1, which is found in the mitochondrion and isoform 2, which is found in the nucleus and cytoplasm.

Clinical significance 
ISCU mutations have been found in patients with hereditary mitochondrial myopathy with exercise intolerance and lactic acidosis. This disease is a result of a deficiency of ISCU that corresponds to the deficiency of mitochondrial iron-sulfur proteins and impaired muscle oxidative metabolism. Characteristics of mitochondrial myopathy with deficiency of ISCU may include lifelong exercise intolerance in which exertion can cause tachycardia, dyspnoea, cardiac palpitations, shortness of breath, fatigue, pain of active muscles, rhabdomyolysis, myoglobinuria, elevated lactate and pyruvate, decreased oxygen utilization, large calves, and possibly weakness.

Genetics 
This disorder has been associated with several different mutations and is inherited in an autosomal recessive manner. It was originally believed to affect only those of northern Swedish ancestry, however the disease has been found in those of Norwegian and Finnish decent as well. The carrier rate in northern Sweden has been estimated at 1:188. ISCU deficiency has been linked to pathogenic variants including intronic variants c.418+382G>C, g.7044G>C, and IVS5+382 G>C as well as a c.149G>A missense mutation in exon 3. The intronic mutations have been suggested to activate a cryptic splice site, resulting in the production of a splice variant that encodes a putatively non-functional protein.

Interactions 
ISCU has been shown to have 235 binary protein-protein interactions including 79 co-complex interactions. ISCU appears to interact with ISCS, NUP62, SDHB, HPRT1, CCDC172, GOLGA2, IKZF1, KRT40, AGTRAP, NECAB2, FAM9B, BANP, LNX1, MID2, GOLGA6L9, ccdc136, KRT34, SPERT, PICK1, YWHAB, SFN, mbl, E7, dnaX, hscB, MAPk-Ak2, hale, and cv-c.

References

Further reading

External links 
  GeneReviews/NCBI/NIH/UW entry on Myopathy with Deficiency of ISCU
  GeneReviews/NIH/NCBI/UW entry on Myopathy with Deficiency of ISCU